El Lado Oscuro (en: "The Dark Side") is the second studio album by power metal band DarkSun, released in 2004. The band entered the studios at the end of 2003. Just like El Legado, this album was recorded in Germany, with Ingo Cjavkoski in the production. This time the band had Dennis Ward on mixings. (who was better known for his work with Angra), and Lars Ratz (from Metalium) assisted on the vocals production. Once again the reviews were as good as they could possibly be, like "...it's a varied work, where power and heavy metal alternate and mi", and "El Lado Oscuro is a really good power metal album". Peavy Wagner (of Rage fame) performed vocals on a song, which was released as a bonus track on the album, entitled "Prisoners of Fate".

Track listing
Invocación 
El lado oscuro 
Renacer 
Esclavos del miedo 
Hermanos de sangre 
Prisioneros del destino 
Como el viento 
Elegía I, Confrontación 
Elegía II, Luz entre tinieblas 
Elegía III, Agonía 
Tumbas de nieve

Members 

Dani González - vocals, guitars
Tino Hevia - guitars
Pedro Junquera - bass
Víctor Fernández - keyboards
Rafael Yugueros - drums

External links
DarkSun's Website

2006 albums
DarkSun albums